Oberkorn railway station is a railway station serving Oberkorn, in south-western Luxembourg.  It is operated by Chemins de Fer Luxembourgeois, the state-owned railway company.

The station is situated on Line 60, which connects Luxembourg City to the Red Lands of the south of the country.

External links
 Official CFL page on Oberkorn station
 Rail.lu page on Oberkorn station

Railway stations in Differdange
Railway stations on CFL Line 60